"Cry Me a River" is a popular American torch song, written by Arthur Hamilton, first published in 1953 and made famous in 1955 with the version by Julie London.

Origins and early recordings
Arthur Hamilton later said of the song:  "I had never heard the phrase. I just liked the combination of words...  Instead of 'Eat your heart out' or 'I'll get even with you,' it sounded like a good, smart retort to somebody who had hurt your feelings or broken your heart."  He was initially concerned that listeners would hear a reference to the Crimea, rather than "..cry me a...", but said that  "..sitting down and playing the melody and coming up with lyrics made it a nonissue."

A bluesy jazz ballad, "Cry Me a River" was originally written for Ella Fitzgerald to sing in the 1920s-set film, Pete Kelly's Blues (released 1955). According to Hamilton, he and Julie London had been high school classmates, and she contacted him on behalf of her husband, Jack Webb, who was the film's director and was looking for new songs for its soundtrack.
After the song was dropped from the film, Fitzgerald first released her version on Clap Hands, Here Comes Charlie! in 1961. The song was also offered to Peggy King, but Columbia Records A&R chief Mitch Miller objected to the word "plebeian" in the lyric.

The song's first release was by actress and singer Julie London on Liberty Records in 1955, backed by Barney Kessel on guitar and Ray Leatherwood on bass.  London had been urged to record the song by Bobby Troup, whom she would later marry after her divorce from Webb.   A performance of the song by London in the 1956 film The Girl Can't Help It, helped to make it a bestseller (reaching no. 9 on US and no. 22 on the UK Singles Chart). It became a gold record, and in 2016, it was inducted by the Library of Congress in the National Recording Registry.

Notable recordings
One site, Secondhand Songs, lists 484 recorded versions of the song (as at March 2020).  Versions that charted include:
Barbra Streisand (1963) the first song on her first album, The Barbra Streisand Album
Marie Knight (1969) number 35 on Billboard R&B
Joe Cocker (live version) (1970) number 11 on Billboard 
Aerosmith (1982)
Mari Wilson (1983) number 27 on UK Singles Chart from Showpeople
Denise Welch (1995) number 23 on UK Singles Chart
Elaine Paige (2004) for her album Centre Stage which reached number 35 on the UK Albums Chart
Merle Haggard released an unusual country version of the song on his 2004 release Unforgettable
Rick Astley (2005) number 26 on the UK Albums Chart for his 6th studio album Portrait
Michael Bublé (2009) number 34 on UK Singles Chart

The Julie London version also appears in the 2006 film V for Vendetta starring Natalie Portman and John Hurt.

References

External links
Peggy King performs Cry Me a River at the Metropolitan Room in 2014
Cry Me a River at jazzstandards.com

Songs about heartache
Songs about rivers
1953 songs
Torch songs
Pop ballads
Ella Fitzgerald songs
Mari Wilson songs
Grammy Hall of Fame Award recipients
Songs written by Arthur Hamilton
1950s jazz standards
United States National Recording Registry recordings
Jazz compositions in E minor